Bryana Pizarro (born 2002) is a Puerto Rican footballer who plays as a forward for collegiate team Oregon State Beavers and the Puerto Rico women's national team.

Early life
Pizarro was raised in Valley Stream, New York. Her father is Puerto Rican and her mother is Honduran.

High school and college career
Pizarro has attended the Valley Stream South High School in South Valley Stream, New York and the Oregon State University in Corvallis, Oregon.

International career
Pizarro made her senior debut for Puerto Rico on June 12, 2021, in a 1–5 friendly away loss to Uruguay.

References 

2002 births
Living people
People from Valley Stream, New York
Sportspeople from Nassau County, New York
Soccer players from New York (state)
American women's soccer players
Puerto Rican women's footballers
Women's association football forwards
Oregon State Beavers women's soccer players
Puerto Rico women's international footballers
American sportspeople of Puerto Rican descent
American people of Honduran descent
 Puerto Rican people of Honduran descent
Valley Stream South High School alumni